This List of William Penn Charter School people catalogs notable alumni of William Penn Charter School, a private school in Philadelphia, Pennsylvania.

Chris Albright, OPC ’97, professional soccer player 
Rubén Amaro, Jr., OPC '83, baseball player, general manager Philadelphia Phillies, and coach Boston Red Sox and New York Mets
 Steven Balbus, OPC '71, Savilian Professor of Astronomy, University of Oxford
 Donald Barnhouse, OPC '39, American Christian preacher, pastor, radio pioneer
David Berkoff, OPC ’84, Olympic medalist in swimming 
Raynal Bolling, OPC '96 (1896), first high-ranking U.S. officer to be killed in combat in World War I
Henry Joel Cadbury, OPC '99 (1899), Quaker scholar, teacher, Harvard Divinity chair 1934–54
Bobby Convey, '98 (did not graduate), professional soccer player 
Charles Gwynne Douglas, III, OPC '60, former Supreme Court Justice from the state of New Hampshire, former US Congressman
Pierre S. du Pont OPC 1886, industrialist, philanthropist, DuPont Corporation director, one-time Chairman of General Motors.
J. Presper Eckert, OPC '37, University of Pennsylvania researcher, computer pioneer, co-creator of the world's first electronic computer, ENIAC
Richard B Fisher, OPC '53, chairman emeritus of Morgan Stanley
Mark Gubicza, OPC '81, former professional baseball pitcher
Adam F. Goldberg, OPC '94, television and film writer, created The Goldbergs and Schooled, both of which take place partially or fully at William Penn Academy, which is a fictionalized version of William Penn Charter School.
Bill Green IV, OPC '83, former chairman of the Philadelphia School Reform Commission and former Philadelphia City Council member at-large 
Crawford Greenewalt, OPC '18, chemist, head of DuPont Corp. '48–'67, developed Nylon fabrics. 
John Grotzinger, OPC '75, geologist, professor Co-investigator on the Mars 2020 Rover. 
George Hauptfuhrer, OPC '44, third overall selection in the 1948 BAA Draft
Howard Head, OPC ’32, founder of Head Ski Company & Prince Manufacturing Inc. 1914–1991 
Joseph M. Hoeffel, OPC '68, Pennsylvania 13th District Congressman
John B. Kelly Jr., OPC ’45, Olympic medalist and former president of the U.S. Olympic committee, brother of Grace Kelly
Leicester Bodine Holland, architect and archaeologist
Kenny Koplove, OPC '12, professional baseball pitcher
Rob Kurz, OPC '04, NBA player
David Leebron, OPC '73, president of Rice University in Houston, Texas 
Richard Lester, director 
Douglas Macgregor PhD., American senior military officer and author.
Mike McGlinchey (offensive lineman), OPC '13, offensive tackle for the San Francisco 49ers
Jack Meyer, OPC '50, former pitcher for the Philadelphia Phillies
David Montgomery, OPC '64, President of the Philadelphia Phillies
David W. Oxtoby, OPC '68, President of Pomona College and professor of chemistry
Endicott Peabody, former Governor of Massachusetts, member of the College Football Hall of Fame (defense for Harvard).
Robert Picardo, OPC '71, The Doctor on Star Trek: Voyager
William T. Read, lawyer, President of the New Jersey Senate, Treasurer of New Jersey
Tony Resch, OPC '81, former professional lacrosse player, current coach, and NLL Hall of Fame inductee 
Grover C. Richman, Jr., U.S. Attorney for the District of New Jersey (1951–53) and New Jersey Attorney General (1954–58)
David Riesman, OPC '26, former Harvard University sociology professor, lawyer, author of sociology classic "The Lonely Crowd"
Matt Ryan, OPC '03, quarterback for the Atlanta Falcons
Vic Seixas, OPC '41, former professional tennis player, won Wimbledon in 1953 and the US Open in 1954.
Sean Singletary, OPC '04, professional basketball player
David Sirota, OPC '94, author, journalist, and political strategist
J.C. Spink OPC 1990, Manager and Producer, Principal at Benderspink.
J. David Stern, OPC 1902, Publisher of The Philadelphia Record (1928–47) and other newspapers
Frederick F. Woerner, Jr., OPC '51, former Commander-in-Chief, United States Southern Command (1987–89)
Jesse Watters (did not graduate), Watters World, Fox News
Daryl Worley, OPC '13, professional football player

References

Lists of American people by school affiliation